Jane Hyatt Yolen (born February 11, 1939) is an American writer of fantasy, science fiction, and children's books. She is the author or editor of more than 350 books, of which the best known is The Devil's Arithmetic, a Holocaust novella. Her other works include the Nebula Award−winning short story "Sister Emily's Lightship", the novelette "Lost Girls", Owl Moon, The Emperor and the Kite, the Commander Toad series and How Do Dinosaurs Say Goodnight. She has collaborated on works with all three of her children, most extensively with Adam Stemple.

Yolen gave the lecture for the 1989 Alice G. Smith Lecture, the inaugural year for the series. This lecture series is held at the University of South Florida School of Information "to honor the memory of its first director, Alice Gullen Smith, known for her work with youth and bibliotherapy." In 2012 she became the first woman to give the Andrew Lang lecture. Yolen published her 400th book in early 2021, Bear Outside.

Early life
Jane Hyatt Yolen was born on February 11, 1939, at Beth Israel Medical Center in Manhattan. She is the first child of Isabell Berlin Yolen, a psychiatric social worker who became a full-time mother and homemaker upon Yolen's birth, and Will Hyatt Yolen, a journalist who wrote columns at the time for New York newspapers, and whose family emigrated from the Ukraine to the United States. Isabell also did volunteer work, and wrote short stories in her spare time. However, she was not able to sell them. Because the Hyatts, the family of Yolen's grandmother, Mina Hyatt Yolen, only had girls, a number of the children of Yolen's generation were given their last name as a middle name in order to perpetuate it.

When Yolen was barely one year old, the family moved to California to accommodate Will's new job working for Hollywood film studios, doing publicity on films such as American Tragedy and Knut Rockne. The family moved back to New York City prior to the birth of Yolen's brother, Steve. When Will joined the Army as a Second Lieutenant to fight in England during World War II, Yolen, her mother and brother lived with her grandparents, Danny and Dan, in Newport News, Virginia. After the war, the family moved back to Manhattan, living on Central Park West and 97th Street until Yolen turned 13. She attended PS 93, where she enjoyed writing and singing, and became friends with future radio presenter Susan Stamberg. She also engaged writing by creating a newspaper for her apartment with her brother that she sold for five cents a copy. She was accepted to Music and Art High School. During the summer prior to that semester, she attended a Vermont summer camp, which was her first involvement with the Society of Friends (Quakers). Her family also moved to a ranch house in Westport, Connecticut, where she attended Bedford Junior high for ninth grade, and then Staples High School. She received a BA from Smith College in 1960 and a master's degree in Education from the University of Massachusetts in 1978. After graduating she moved back to New York City.

Career
During the 1960s, Yolen held editorial positions at various magazines and publishers in New York City, including Gold Medal Books, Routledge Books, and Alfred A. Knopf Juvenile Books. From 1990 to 1996 she ran her own young adult fiction imprint, Jane Yolen Books, at Harcourt Brace.

Although Yolen considered herself a poet, journalist and nonfiction writer, she became a children's book writer. Her first published book was Pirates in Petticoats, which was published on her 22nd birthday.

Year's Best Science Fiction and Fantasy for Teens, Favorite Folktales From Around the World, Xanadu and Xanadu 2 are among the works that she has edited.

Her book Naming Liberty tells the story of a Russian girl and Frédéric Auguste Bartholdi, the designer of the Statue of Liberty.

She has co-written two books with her son, the writer and musician Adam Stemple, Pay the Piper and Troll Bridge, both part of the Rock 'n' Roll Fairy Tale series. She also wrote lyrics for the song "Robin's Complaint," recorded on the 1994 album Antler Dance by Stemple's band Boiled in Lead.

Regarding the similarities between her novel Wizard's Hall and the Harry Potter series, Yolen has commented on J. K. Rowling, the author of that series:

Personal life
In 1962, Yolen married David W. Stemple. They had three children and six grandchildren. David Stemple died in March 2006. Yolen lives in Western Massachusetts. She also owns a house in Scotland, where she lives for a few months each year.

Awards
1987 Special World Fantasy Award (for Favorite Folktales From Around the World)
1989 Sydney Taylor Book Award for Older Readers (for The Devil's Arithmetic) 
1992 The Catholic Library Association's Regina Medal (for her body of children's literature)
1999 Nebula Award for Novelette (for "Lost Girls")
2009 World Fantasy Award for Life Achievement at the 2010 World Fantasy Convention. A panel of judges selects about two people annually.
2017 Damon Knight Memorial Grand Master Award

Nominations
1984 World Fantasy Award for Anthology/Collection (for Tales of Wonder)
1986 World Fantasy Award for Anthology/Collection (for Dragonfield and Other Stories)
1987 World Fantasy Award for Anthology/Collection (for Merlin's Booke)
1989 World Fantasy Award for Best Novella (for Briar Rose)
1993 World Fantasy Award for Best Novel (for The Devil's Arithmetic)
2009 Sydney Taylor Book Award Younger Reader Honor	(for Naming Liberty, illustrated by Jim Burke)
2021 Sydney Taylor Book Award Picture Book Honor (for Miriam at the River, illustrated by Khoa Le)

Bibliography

References

External links

 
 Yolen's writing journal
 
 
 Bibliography on SciFan
 2001 interview and review of Briar Rose by RoseEtta Stone (underdown.org)
 2007 interview by Childrensbookradio
 2017 interview by The Portalist
 
 Biography by Rita Berman Frischer, Encyclopedia, Jewish Women's Archive
 

1939 births
Living people
20th-century American novelists
20th-century American women writers
21st-century American novelists
21st-century American women writers
American children's writers
American fantasy writers
American science fiction writers
American women children's writers
American women novelists
Asimov's Science Fiction people
The High School of Music & Art alumni
Jewish American writers
Jewish American artists
Nebula Award winners
Novelists from Massachusetts
Novelists from New York (state)
People from Hampshire County, Massachusetts
Rhysling Award for Best Short Poem winners
SFWA Grand Masters
Science fiction editors
Smith College alumni
University of Massachusetts Amherst College of Education alumni
Women science fiction and fantasy writers
World Fantasy Award-winning writers
Staples High School alumni
21st-century American Jews